The 2021–22 UCI Track Cycling season is the seventeenth season of the UCI Track Cycling Season. The 2021–22 season began on 28 October 2021 with the Indonesian Track National Championships and will end in October 2022 with 2022 UCI Track Cycling World Championships. It is organised by the Union Cycliste Internationale.

Events

2021

National Championships

Individuals

Individual Pursuit

Individual Keirin

Individual Sprint

Individual Time Trial

Individual Elimination Race

Individual Scratch Race

Individual Points Race

Individual Omnium

Individual Madison

Teams

Team Sprint

Team Pursuit

See also
2007 in track cycling
2008 in track cycling

References

2021 in track cycling
2022 in track cycling
Track cycling by year